Cercidospora macrospora is a species of lichenicolous fungus in the genus Cercidospora but it has not been assigned to a family. It is known from the northern hemisphere.

Known host species include lichen of the genus Lecanora.

References

Dothideomycetes
Fungi described in 2004
Fungi of India
Lichenicolous fungi